The women's artistic gymnastics uneven bars final at the 2019 European Games was held at the Minsk Arena on June 30.

Qualification 

Qualification took place on June 27. Becky Downie from Great Britain qualified in first, followed by Belgium's Nina Derwael and Anastasia Ilyankova of Russia. Ilyankova withdrew before the final due to an allergic reaction requiring medical attention, and was replaced by teammate Angelina Melnikova.

The reserves were:

Medalists

Results 
Oldest and youngest competitors

References

Gymnastics at the 2019 European Games